Jushin or Jooshin or Jowshin may refer to:
 Jushin, East Azerbaijan
 Jushin, Kerman
 Jushin, South Khorasan
 Jushin Rural District, in East Azerbaijan Province